The Metavay sawbelly (Hoplostethus shubnikovi) is a slimehead of the order Beryciformes. It is native to the Indian Ocean along the northern section of the Mentawai ridge and western Australia.

References

External links
 
 Metavay Sawbelly, Hoplostethus shubnikovi Kotlyar 1980 @ fishesofaustralia.net.au

Hoplostethus
Fauna of Sumatra
Marine fish of Western Australia
Fish described in 1980